Note on the importance of the internal forum and the inviolability of the Sacramental Seal is a July 1, 2019, document of the Apostolic Penitentiary, approved for promulgation on June 21, 2019, by Pope Francis, which explains that the internal forum of the sacrament of penance is sacred and that the inviolability of the Seal of the Confessional in the Catholic Church is absolute, in spite of civil law, as a matter of de fide dogma, and as part of freedom of religion and freedom of conscience. The aim of the Note is to fortify the feeling of trust on the part of people who go to confession.

Internal forum
At the presentation of the Note, Pope Francis explained the meaning of the canon law term "internal forum":

Responses
Reuters, KATV, The Wall Street Journal, The Irish Times, and CBS News were among the media outlets to say that the Vatican was failing to fight clerical sex abuse by not weakening the sacramental seal. The Catholic News Agency welcomed the document, describing it as a reminder of the teachings of the Catholic Church.

See also
 Priest–penitent privilege

References

External links
 English: Presentation of the Note of the Apostolic Penitentiary on the importance of the internal forum and the inviolability of the sacramental seal
 Italian: Note of the Apostolic Penitentiary on the importance of the internal forum and the inviolability of the sacramental seal

Confession (Catholic Church)
Priest–penitent privilege
Sacramental law
Catholic liturgy
Sacraments of the Catholic Church
Catholic theology and doctrine
Catholic doctrines
Documents of the Catholic Church
2019 documents
Apostolic Penitentiary